Thiri Thihathura Shwetaungtet (also Anawrahta I of Sagaing; 1313–1339) was king of Sagaing from 1335/36 to 1339. He came to power by deposing his father Tarabya. He was assassinated three years later by the loyalists of his father.

Brief
His father Tarabya was a commoner stepson of King Thihathu of Pinya; his mother, whose identity is unknown, may have been of royal descent. Shwedaungtet was likely born in either 1313 in Pinya or  1312 in Pinle. From 1315 onwards, he grew up in Sagaing as Tarabya followed Prince Saw Yun's insurrection of Thihathu in 1315.

Shwedaungtet's stature likely grew after his father succeeded Saw Yun as ruler of Sagaing in 1327. While Tarabya may have been a regent on behalf of Saw Yun's young children—the eldest son Kyaswa was not yet 4—Shwedaungtet was nearly ten years older than Kyaswa. Although Shwedaungtet's claim to the throne was weaker than those of the three sons of Saw Yun, he eyed the throne nonetheless. He decided to act before his cousins reached teenage years. In 1335/36, he successfully staged a palace coup and imprisoned his father.

The usurper, now with the reign names of Anawrahta and Thiri Thihathura however could not eliminate Saw Yun's children. The dowager Queen Saw Hnaung with the help of Chief Minister Nanda Pakyan hid the children (and Thado Hsinhtein, the husband of the eldest child Soe Min Kodawgyi) in faraway Mindon inside Pinya territory. She had to continue bribing the powerful minister, who may have also been her lover.

In 1339, Shwedaungtet located the whereabouts of his cousins, led an expedition into Pinya territory, brought them back to Sagaing. But he was assassinated  August 1339, soon after he got back to the Sagaing Palace, by the loyalists of his father the deposed king. Chief Minister Nanda Pakyan's forces ultimately defeated Tarabya's loyalists in the ensuing battle. The powerful minister ordered the execution of Tarabya, and placed Kyaswa on the throne.

Chronicle reporting differences
The royal chronicles do not agree on his birth, death and reign dates.

Notes

References

Bibliography
 
 
 
 
 

Myinsaing dynasty
Sagaing dynasty
1339 deaths
1313 births
14th-century Burmese monarchs